The Canadian Association of Music Libraries, Archives and Documentation Centres (CAML; , ACBM) is a national association that represents music librarians across Canada. Members work in organizations that support musical activities in Canada, including libraries, archives, conservatories, and universities. The organization aims to support all aspects of music librarianship in Canada, including research and scholarship, and to cooperate with other national and international organizations concerned with music.

CAML is the Canadian branch of the International Association of Music Libraries, Archives and Documentation Centres (IAML).

The association archives are held at Library and Archives Canada.

History 
The association was preceded by the Canadian Music Library Association (CMLA), which was a section of the Canadian Library Association founded in 1956. In 1971, the association was reconstituted as the Canadian Association of Music Libraries, and in 1992 the name was changed to the Canadian Association of Music Libraries, Archives and Documentation Centres.

Helmut Kallmann was made an honorary member in 1987.

Activities

Annual meetings 
The association meets annually, often with the Canadian University Music Society (MusCan) and the Congress Federation for Humanities and Social Sciences. The first IAML meeting to be held in Canada took place in Montreal in 1975.

Cataloguing Committee 
The Cataloguing Committee is responsible for giving advice on proposed rule changes as brought forward by the Canadian Committee on Cataloguing, which is a national advisory committee on matters of cataloguing and bibliographic control. The Cataloguing Committee also communicates information to members about developments in the field of music cataloguing.

RILM/CAML Committee 
This committee is responsible for abstracting Canadian music publications, which are then added to the Répertoire International de Littérature Musicale (RILM) database. In addition to monographs and doctoral dissertations, the RILM Canada Committee abstracts the following journals:

Primary:
 Canadian journal of music therapy/Revue canadienne de musicothérapie 
 Intersections: Canadian journal of music 
 Les cahiers de la Société québécoise de recherche en musique 
 Musicological explorations 
 Studies in music from the University of Western Ontario 
Secondary:
 CAML review 
 Canadian music educator 
 Canadian winds: The journal of the Canadian Band Association/Vents canadiens : Revue de l'Association canadienne de l'harmonie 
 Opera Canada 
 Recherche en éducation musicale au Québec

CAML Review 
CAML began publishing a journal in 1972 entitled Newsletter/Nouvelles. The title was changed to CAML Review / Revue de l'ACBM in 2001. Since 2006, CAML Review / Revue de l'ACBM has been published as an open access journal. It includes research articles (peer-reviewed section), reports, news, essays, and reviews on topics relevant to the purposes of the Association, particularly those pertaining to music in Canada, music librarianship and archival management, and bibliography. The print version of CAML Review was discontinued in 2011. An index to volumes 1 - 38 of the CAML Newsletter and CAML Review was compiled by Kathleen McMorrow.

Awards 
CAML provides awards for conference attendance, participation, and research. In 1998, CAML established the Helmut Kallmann Award for excellence in music librarianship and archives work in Canada. The award is named after Dr Helmut Kallmann, chief of the music division at the National Library of Canada from 1970 until 1981. The award is open to those who have made a substantial contribution to the preservation, development and/or research of Canadian music collections.

Kallmann Award past recipients 

 Jane Ann Pearce Baldwin (2000)
 Maria Calderisi (2002)
 Dr Elaine Keillor (2004)
 Daniel Paradis (2017)
 Brian Thompson (2022)

References

External links
Official website
CAML Review
Canadian Association of Music Libraries. In Historica Canada.

1971 establishments in Canada
Canadian library associations
Archivist associations based in Canada
Library
Organizations established in 1971
Music libraries
Music organizations based in Canada